Rainbow Valley is a 1935 American Western film released by Monogram Pictures, written by Lindsley Parsons, directed by Robert N. Bradbury and starring John Wayne and Gabby Hayes.

Plot
Riding to the small town of Rainbow Valley, John Martin meets George, the mailman for the area, who is looking for water for his car. Martin, surprised to see a car, gives George his canteen of water. Farther down the road, highwaymen have set up an ambush for George. Martin, who is following on horseback, drives off the highwaymen.

Martin takes George to the town doctor. Eleanor, the postmistress, is suspicious of Martin, but George explains how he fought off the gang. The townspeople are tired of being terrorized by the highwaymen.  They are circulating a petition to the governor for assistance in completing their road and ridding it of the gang, which is led by Rogers, a wealthy landowner whose goal is to drive out the townspeople and buy their land cheaply.

Martin went to school for engineering, and volunteers to take charge of the road work. With Martin's encouragement, the road workers start defending themselves against gang attacks. A shoot-out occurs, and George uses dynamite to fend off the attackers.

Rogers walks into the Post Office and steals the road petition, substituting another petition to release a gang member, Butch, from jail. The gang also steals all the remaining dynamite.

Two weeks later, Martin and George wonder why they have not heard any response to the petition. At the gang hideout, the pardoned Butch wants to see Martin, who was his cellmate in jail. Martin seems happy to hear that Butch is in town, and meets with him. He agrees to destroy the road in return for a cut of the profits when the townspeople sell out.
 
The townspeople gather and talk about how Martin has betrayed them. Powell issues a call to arms. George and Eleanor find a letter from the governor. Martin is actually an undercover agent who is trying to bust the gang.

The mob approaches the gang and Martin. A shoot-out begins between the townspeople and the gang. Butch sets off the dynamite, killing Rogers and all of his men. Martin arrests Butch and explains his undercover assignment to the townspeople.

George drives his car up to the hill and remarks on the road's success. In the back seat of the car, Martin and Eleanor are kissing.

Cast
 John Wayne as John Martin
 Lucile Browne as Eleanor
 George "Gabby" Hayes as George Hale
 LeRoy Mason as Rogers
 Lloyd Ingraham as Warden Powell
 Jay Wilsey as Butch Galt 
 Frank Ball as Powell
 Bert Dillard as henchman Spike

See also
 John Wayne filmography

External links

 
 
 

1935 films
American Western (genre) films
American black-and-white films
Films directed by Robert N. Bradbury
1935 Western (genre) films
1930s English-language films
Monogram Pictures films
1930s American films